Citharacanthus is a genus of New World tarantulas. They are found in Central America and the Antilles.

Species 
, the World Spider Catalog accepted the following 7 species:
Citharacanthus alayoni Rudloff, 1995 – Cuba
Citharacanthus cyaneus (Rudloff, 1994) – Cuba
Citharacanthus livingstoni Schmidt & Weinmann, 1996 – Guatemala
Citharacanthus longipes (F. O. Pickard-Cambridge, 1897) (type species) – Mexico, Central America
Citharacanthus meermani Reichling & West, 2000 – Belize
Citharacanthus niger Franganillo, 1931 – Cuba
Citharacanthus spinicrus (Latreille, 1819) – Cuba, Hispaniola

References

External links 

Theraphosidae
Theraphosidae genera
Spiders of Central America